Usachyov or Usachov is a Russian masculine surname, its feminine counterpart is Usachyova or Usachova. It may refer to
Andrei Usachyov (born 1986), Russian football player
Daria Usacheva (born 2006), Russian figure skater
Dmitry Usachev (born 1988), Belarusian football player
Nikolai Usachyov (born 1968), Russian football player
Yury Usachov (born 1957), Russia cosmonaut

Russian-language surnames